Bethel is an unincorporated community in Illinois Township, Pope County, Arkansas, United States.

References

Unincorporated communities in Pope County, Arkansas
Unincorporated communities in Arkansas